"Sweet Home Alabama" is a song by American southern rock band Lynyrd Skynyrd, released on the band's second album Second Helping (1974). It was written in response to Neil Young's 1970 song "Southern Man", which the band felt blamed the entire South for American slavery; Young is name-checked and dissed in the lyrics. It reached number eight on the Billboard Hot 100 chart in 1974, becoming the band's highest-charting single.

The song remains a staple in southern and classic rock, and is arguably the band's signature song.

Background and recording
None of the three writers of the song were from Alabama; Ronnie Van Zant and Gary Rossington were both born in Jacksonville, Florida, while Ed King was from Glendale, California. In an interview with Garden & Gun, Rossington explained the writing process: "I had this little riff. It's the little picking part and I kept playing it over and over when we were waiting on everyone to arrive for rehearsal. Ronnie and I were sitting there, and he kept saying, 'play that again'. Then Ronnie wrote the lyrics and Ed and I wrote the music."

"Sweet Home Alabama" was a major chart hit for a band whose previous singles had "lazily sauntered out into release with no particular intent." The hit led to two television rock show offers that the band declined. In addition to the original appearance on Second Helping, the song has appeared on numerous Lynyrd Skynyrd compilations and live albums.

Record World called it the group's "most commercial single entry so far."

Controversy
"Sweet Home Alabama" was written in answer to two songs by Neil Young, "Southern Man" and "Alabama", because the songs "took the entire South to task for the bloody history of slavery and its aftermath." "We thought Neil was shooting all the ducks in order to kill one or two," said Ronnie Van Zant at the time. The lyrics to "Sweet Home Alabama" include the following lines:

In Young's 2012 autobiography Waging Heavy Peace, he commented on his song: "My own song 'Alabama' richly deserved the shot Lynyrd Skynyrd gave me with their great record. I don't like my words when I listen to it. They are accusatory and condescending, not fully thought out, and too easy to misconstrue."

Another part of "Sweet Home Alabama" was also controversial in its reference to George Wallace, the governor of Alabama and supporter of racial segregation:
 

The choice of Birmingham in connection with the governor (rather than the capital of Montgomery) is significant because it was the site of civil rights activism and violence in the 1960s. In 1975, Van Zant said: "The lyrics about the governor of Alabama were misunderstood. The general public didn't notice the words 'Boo! Boo! Boo!' after that particular line, and the media picked up only on the reference to the people loving the governor." "The line 'We all did what we could do' is sort of ambiguous," Al Kooper notes, We tried to get Wallace out of there' is how I always thought of it." Toward the end of the song, Van Zant adds "where the governor's true" to the chorus's "where the skies are so blue," a line seemingly contradictory to the previous lyrics. Journalist Al Swenson argues that the song is more complex than many believe and is not an endorsement of Wallace. Van Zant said: "Wallace and I have very little in common. I don't like what he says about colored people."

Further complicating the racial politics of the song is the fact that Merry Clayton and Clydie King, two well-known black studio singers, are heard on the track as backing vocalists. In a 2013 interview, Clayton spoke at length about her decision to take the job. In her recollection, her initial response was negative: "[Clydie King] said the song was 'Sweet Home Alabama.' There was a silence on the phone for quite a while. I said, 'Clydie, are you serious? I'm not singing nothing about nobody's sweet home Alabama. Period. Nonetheless, Clayton was persuaded to take the job, to "let the music be [her] protest."

Music historians examining the juxtaposition of invoking Richard Nixon and Watergate after Wallace and Birmingham note that one reading of the lyrics is an "attack against the liberals who were so outraged at Nixon's conduct" while others interpret it regionally: "the band was speaking for the entire South, saying to northerners, we're not judging you as ordinary citizens for the failures of your leaders in Watergate; don't judge all of us as individuals for the racial problems of southern society."

Ed King, the song's cowriter, contradicted his former bandmates in a 2009 post on his website. He claimed that the song was originally intended as the unabashed defense of Alabama, and even Wallace, that the song appears to be:

Personnel

Lynyrd Skynyrd 
 Ronnie Van Zant – lead vocals
 Ed King – lead guitar, backing vocals (first "woo" at the end of the last chorus)
 Leon Wilkeson – bass guitar, backing vocals (second "woo" at the end of the last chorus)
 Bob Burns – drums
 Billy Powell – piano
 Allen Collins – rhythm guitar (left channel)
 Gary Rossington – rhythm guitar (right channel), acoustic guitar (left channel)

Additional personnel 
 Al Kooper – backing vocals (left channel)
 Clydie King – background vocals
 Merry Clayton – background vocals

Charts

Weekly charts

Year-end chart

Sales and certifications

"All Summer Long"
Kid Rock's 2008 song "All Summer Long" interpolates "Sweet Home Alabama" on the chorus and uses the guitar solo and piano outro, as well as the "turn it up" shout before the guitar solo; Billy Powell is featured on the track. "All Summer Long" also samples Warren Zevon's "Werewolves of London", which has similar chord progression to "Sweet Home Alabama".

The song is credited to Matthew Shafer, Waddy Wachtel, R.J. Ritchie, Leroy Marinell, Warren Zevon, Edward King, Gary Rossington and Ronnie Van Zant. Since "All Summer Long"'s release, the original song has also charted at number 44 on the UK Singles Chart.

Other uses

 In September 2007, Alabama governor Bob Riley announced that the phrase "Sweet Home Alabama" would be used to promote Alabama state tourism in a multimillion-dollar ad campaign. In 2009, the state of Alabama began using the phrase as an official slogan on motor-vehicle license plates, and Riley noted that the song is the third most-played that refers to a specific destination.
In 2002, the song inspired the title and plot of the film Sweet Home Alabama.
American heavy metal band Metallica used the intro riff for their 1983 song "The Four Horsemen", which gained controversy as the riff was used without permission from the band.

Recognition and awards
 In May 2006, National Review ranked the song #4 on its list of the 50 greatest conservative rock songs.
 In July 2006, CMT ranked it as the #1 southern rock song.

References

External links

 Lynyrd Skynyrd and Neil Young: Friends or Foes?—An analysis of "Sweet Home Alabama" and "Southern Man"
 "Sweet Home Alabama" lyrics on lynyrdskynyrdhistory.com
 "Sweet Home Alabama" song guide, lyrical analysis, historical context and allusions, teaching guide

1974 singles
Music of Alabama
Lynyrd Skynyrd songs
Songs about Alabama
Answer songs
Song recordings produced by Al Kooper
Songs written by Ed King
Songs written by Gary Rossington
Songs written by Ronnie Van Zant
Alabama (American band) songs
1974 songs
MCA Records singles
Alabama culture
Neil Young
George Wallace
Race-related controversies in music